Evan Lloyd (born 2 June 2000) is a Welsh rugby union player, currently playing for Pro14 side Dragons. His preferred position is fly-half or fullback.

Dragons
Lloyd was named in the Dragons transition squad for the 2020–21 Pro14 season. He made his Dragons debut in Round 2 of the 2020–21 European Rugby Champions Cup against Bordeaux Bègles.

References

External links
itsrugby.co.uk Profile

2000 births
Living people
Welsh rugby union players
Dragons RFC players
Rugby union fly-halves
Rugby union fullbacks